Michael Geaney (born 2 October 1989) is an Irish Gaelic footballer who plays for Dingle and has played at senior level for the Kerry county team since 2012.

He is a cousin of Kerry footballer Paul Geaney and younger brother of former Kerry player David Geaney.

References

1989 births
Living people
Dingle Gaelic footballers
Kerry inter-county Gaelic footballers